Adamswiller (German: Adamsweiler) is a commune in the Bas-Rhin department in the Grand Est region of northeastern France.

The inhabitants of the commune are known as Adamswillerois or Adamswilleroises.

Geography
Adamswiller is located some 20 km north by north-west of Phalsbourg and 20 km south-east of Sarralbe. The D9 road from Mackwiller passes south through the western part of the commune on the way to Durstel in the south. The D182 runs off the D9 in the commune to Rexingen in the south-west. There is also the D239 road from the village going north-east to join the D919 road just outside the commune. The commune is mostly farmland with a little forest in the east.

The commune is renowned for its pink sandstone from the north-east of the commune which has been approved for the restoration of historical monuments.

The Eichel river forms the north-western border of the commune and the Marstbach forms the western border. The commune lies within the Northern Vosges Regional Natural Park.

Neighbouring communes and villages

History
The commune was formerly part of the County of La Petite-Pierre. Between Adamswiller and Mackwiller there have been found ancient tombs which have been given the name Totdenberg due to the heights on which they were found (The hill of the Dead).

Heraldry

Toponymy
 1281: Adelmanswiler
 1793: Adamsweiller
 1801: Adamswiler

In German: Adamsweiler.

Administration

List of Successive Mayors of Adamswiller

Population

Culture and heritage

Civil heritage
The commune has a number of buildings and structures that are registered as historical monuments:
 A Blacksmith's House at 27 Rue Principale (1881)
 The Town Hall / School at 44 Rue Principale (19th century)
 A Farmhouse at 51 Rue Principale (1825)
 A Farmhouse at 55 Rue Principale (1909)
 The Au Cheval Noir restaurant at 59 Rue Principale (1857)
 The Weaver's House at 68 Rue Principale (18th century)
 The Worker's House at 69 Rue Principale (1835)
 A Restaurant at 73 Rue Principale (1895)
 The Totenberg Tile Factory at RD 239 (1806)
 Houses and Farms
 A Public Bench at 12 Rue de la Gare (1856) is registered as an historical object.

Other sites of interest
 The Rauscher Quarry

Religious heritage
The commune has several religious buildings and structures that are registered as historical monuments:
 A Monstrance Altar Bench at CD 239 (1856)
 A Lutheran Church at Rue Principale (1836). The Church has several items which are registered as historical objects:
 The Furniture in the Church (Supplementary)
 The Organ (1846)
 A Baptismal Ewer and Basin (19th century)
 The Cemetery (1905). All movable items in the Cemetery are registered as historical objects.

See also
 Communes of the Bas-Rhin department
 Communes of the Bas-Rhin department sorted by arrondissements and cantons
 Communities of Communes of the Bas-Rhin département
 Arrondissements of the Bas-Rhin département
 Cantons of the Bas-Rhin département

External links
 Adamswiller on the old National Geographic Institute website 
 Adamswiller on Géoportail, National Geographic Institute (IGN) website 
 Adamsweiller on the 1750 Cassini Map

References

Communes of Bas-Rhin